Bikkulovo (Biqqol) is a rural locality (a village) in Tashbulatovsky Selsoviet, Abzelilovsky District, Bashkortostan, Russia. The population was 292 as of 2010. There are 2 streets.

Geography 
Bikkulovo is located 53 km north of Askarovo (the district's administrative centre) by road. Telyashevo is the nearest rural locality.

References 

Rural localities in Abzelilovsky District